16 Biggest Hits is a compilation album by country singer Johnny Cash released in 1999.

The album is made of the biggest hits of Cash's career like "Ring of Fire", "Understand Your Man", and "A Boy Named Sue". The album also contains several songs which were not hits such as "I Still Miss Someone", and "The Legend of John Henry's Hammer".

Cash had 13 US #1 country hits between the years 1956 and 1976, with this album containing only 8 of them.

The album was certified 2× Platinum in 2005 by the RIAA. It has sold 3,203,000 copies in the US as of May 2013.

Track listing

Charts
Album - Billboard (United States)

Year-end charts

Certifications

References

Cash, Johnny
1999 greatest hits albums
Johnny Cash compilation albums
Columbia Records compilation albums